An election to Galway City Council took place on 5 June 2009 as part of that year's Irish local elections. 15 councillors were elected from three electoral divisions by PR-STV voting for a five-year term of office.

Results by party

Results by Electoral Area

Galway City Central

Galway City East

Galway City West

External links
 Official website

2009 Irish local elections
2009